Yu Chung-han, a prominent civilian politician of Zhang Xueliang's Northeastern government, who favored the autonomy of Manchuria and aided Japan's establishment of the puppet state of Manchukuo.

Yu Chung-han, was a prominent elder statesman of Zhang Xueliang's Government in Mukden and the leader of the civilian group in Manchuria which favored "hokyo anmin" (secure boundary and peaceful life), meaning according to him, the protection and prosperity of the Northeastern Provinces were to be the supreme concern of the government, including the relationship with China proper.  He intended by means of tax reforms, improvement of the wage system of government officials, and abolition of the costly army, to ensure the people in Manchuria the benefits of peace labor, while defense was to be entrusted to Japan.

Following the Mukden Incident and the Japanese seizure of southern Manchuria, he was installed as chief of the Japanese imposed Northeastern Self-Government Guiding Board on November 10, 1931. As the Chief of the Board, and with Governor Tsang Shih-yi, of Liaoning province, made plans for a new State to be established in February 1932.

Upon learning of the complete defeat and expulsion of Marshal Chang Hsueh-liang from Chinchow, the pro Japanese Self-Government Association and General Zhang Jinghui as Governor of the Province on 7 January 1932, declared the independence of Heilungkiang Province under the protection of Japan. The same day, the Self-Government Guiding Board in Mukden, issued a Proclamation, appealing to the people of the Northeast to overthrow Marshal Zhang Xueliang and join the Northeastern Self-Government Association, which became the state of Manchukuo in March 1932.

External links
IMTFE Judgement, Invasion & Occupation of Manchuria
On the Backgrounds of the Pacific War

Chinese people of World War II
Chinese collaborators with Imperial Japan